Jerzy Krawczyk (17 November 1928 – 25 December 2008) was a Polish boxer. He competed in the men's light middleweight event at the 1952 Summer Olympics.

References

1928 births
2008 deaths
Polish male boxers
Olympic boxers of Poland
Boxers at the 1952 Summer Olympics
Sportspeople from Łódź
Light-middleweight boxers